Donald Knight  (born June 8, 1947) is the 1965-1967 Canadian national champion in men's singles. He won the North American Figure Skating Championships in 1967, having placed third in the previous competition, in 1965. Knight also won the bronze medal at the World Figure Skating Championships in 1965.  He trained with coach Ellen Burka.

After retiring from competitive skating, Knight toured for eleven years as a Principal Performer with Ice Capades and Holiday on Ice in Europe.  Knight currently works as a skating coach consultant with the Burlington Skate Centre and Oakville Skating Club in Halton Region of Ontario, Canada.

Results

References

 SkateHistory.ca Feature Story (June 2005)
 Oakville Skating Club Coaches Bios

Navigation

1947 births
Living people
Canadian male single skaters
Figure skaters at the 1964 Winter Olympics
Olympic figure skaters of Canada
World Figure Skating Championships medalists
20th-century Canadian people
21st-century Canadian people